Vernon Kenneth Zimmerman (born 1928) is an American accounting scholar and Professor of accounting at the University of Illinois, known for his work on the accounting history and international accounting theory.

Biography 
Zimmerman obtained his BS in economics in 1949 at the University of Illinois, where he also obtained his MS in 1949 and his phD in 1954 under A.C. Littleton.

After graduation Zimmerman spend his academic career at the University of Illinois at Urbana Champaign, where he was eventually appointed Professor of accounting. In 1963 he was founding director of the International Center for Accounting Education and Research. From 1967 to 1985 he also served as dean of the College of Commerce and Business Administration. In the year 1979-80 he was President of the  American Assembly of Collegiate Schools of Business.
 
In 1965 Zimmerman was awarded a Guggenheim Fellowships. Recently the UIUC College of Business has renamed the Center for International Education and Research in Accounting (CIERA) to the  Vernon K. Zimmerman Center.

Selected publications 
 Littleton, Ananias Charles, and Vernon Kenneth Zimmerman. Accounting theory, continuity and change. Prentice-Hall, 1962.
 Zimmerman, Vernon Kenneth, ed. Changing international financial markets and their impact on accounting. Center for International Education and Research in Accounting, Dept. of Accountancy, 1992.

Articles, a selection:
 Kafer, Karl, and Vernon K. Zimmerman. "Notes on the evolution of the statement of sources and application of funds'." The International Journal of Accounting 2.2 (1967): 89-121.
 Hassan, Nairn, and Vernon K. Zimmerman. "International Accounting Standards: Desirable as a Short-term Solution in the Case of the Arab Gulf States?." The Recent Accounting and Auditing Developments in the Middle East. Urbana-Champaign: University of Illinois (1985): 69-100.

References

External links 
 Vernon K. Zimmerman Papers, 1945-1996

1928 births
Living people
American accountants
American business theorists
Accounting academics
University of Illinois alumni
University of Illinois faculty